Margaret of Brandenburg-Salzwedel (born ca. 1270 – died 1 May 1315) was a German noblewoman member of the House of Ascania and by her two marriages Duchess of Greater Poland (during 1293–1296), Queen of Poland (during 1295–1296) and Duchess of Saxe-Lauenburg (during 1302–1308).

She was the youngest child and second daughter of Albert III, Margrave of Brandenburg-Salzwedel and Matilda of Denmark, daughter of King Christopher I.

Life
After the death of his second wife Rikissa of Sweden around 1292, Duke Przemysł II of Greater Poland wished to marry for a third time. The choice of Margaret was mainly for political reasons, because for being a member of the powerful House of Ascania and her Pomerelian ancestry (her maternal grandmother was Sambiria of Pomerelia, later Queen Margaret of Denmark), this would have given to the Greater Poland ruler additional rights over his expected inheritance of Gdańsk Pomerania.

Given the relatively close relationship between Przemysł II and Margaret (both were great-grandchildren of Přemysl Otakar I of Bohemia), they needed a papal dispensation in order to marry. The wedding ceremony took place shortly before 13 April 1293; according to some historians, probably on this occasion the betrothal between Przemysł II's daughter Ryksa and Otto of Brandenburg-Salzwedel, Margaret's brother, was also celebrated.

Margaret was crowned queen consort of Poland with her husband at Gniezno Cathedral on Sunday 26 June 1295, the day of Saints John and Paul. It was the first coronation of a Polish king and queen in 219 years. Margaret was the first undisputed queen consort of Poland since Richeza of Lotharingia during the 11th century.

Przemysł II's reign didn't last long. On 8 February 1296, he was kidnapped by men of Margaret's family, with some help from the Polish noble families of Nałęcz and Zaremba and murdered in Rogoźno by Jakub Kaszuba. German chronicler Dietmar of Lübeck pointed that Margaret took part in the conspiracy who killed her husband, due to her family relations. It's unknown whether the chronicler found this information, from earlier sources or deduced it based on the simple relationship: because Margaret came from the family accused of the murder, she had to participate.

Margaret, now queen dowager, stayed in Poland (where she received parts of Greater Poland as her dower, according to a Piast dynasty custom) and took care of her stepdaughter Ryksa, future wife of her brother Otto. Shortly after, and for unknown reasons, Margaret returned to Brandenburg, taking Ryksa with her.

Once in her homeland, Margaret was engaged with Nicholas I the Child, Lord of Rostock and member of the House of Mecklenburg; however, in 1299 the betrothal was broken by Nicholas I, who chose to marry a Pomeranian princess. Around this time, her stepdaughter Ryksa returned to Poland after the death of her intended husband.

Sometime later, another marriage was arranged to Margaret, this time with Albert III, who ruled jointly with his brothers Eric I and John II the Duchy of Saxe-Lauenburg, partitioned from Saxony in 1296. Because Albert III and Margaret are closely related (both are members of the House of Ascania), a papal dispensation was granted in Anagni on 24 September 1302; the marriage was probably celebrated shortly after. They had two sons: Albert (d. 1344; married to Sophie of Ziegenhain, apparently without issue) and Eric (d. 1338, unmarried).

In 1303 Albert III and his brothers divided Saxe-Lauenburg into three branch duchies. Albert III and Margaret then held Saxe-Ratzeburg. After Albert III's death in 1308, his brother Eric I inherited part of Albert's share, while Margaret retained the other part, in order to bring up her children.

Margaret died in 1315 and was buried in Ratzeburg Cathedral. On her death Eric I also took her share of Ratzenburg.

References 

Polish queens consort
1270 births
1315 deaths
House of Ascania
Duchesses of Saxe-Lauenburg
13th-century Polish nobility
13th-century Polish women
14th-century Polish nobility
14th-century Polish women
13th-century German nobility
13th-century German women
14th-century German nobility
14th-century German women
Daughters of monarchs
Remarried royal consorts